The 1940 United States presidential election in Virginia took place on November 5, 1940. Voters chose 11 representatives, or electors to the Electoral College, who voted for president and vice president.

Virginia voted for the Democratic nominee, incumbent President Franklin D. Roosevelt, over the Republican nominee, businessman Wendell Willkie. Roosevelt ultimately won the national election with 54.74% of the vote. The election would be the last time Fairfax County, Virginia's most populous county would vote Democratic until 2004 apart from 1964. , this is the last time the Democratic nominee has won the counties of Greene, Madison and Wythe. It also proved the last time the Democrats would win Montgomery County until Bill Clinton did so in 1992.

Results

Results by county

References

Virginia
1940
1940 Virginia elections